Elisa Chimenti (1883-1969) was an Italian-born author who recorded and translated the oral traditions of Moroccan women.

Early life and education 
Chimenti was born in Naples to Maria Luisa Ruggio Conti and Rosario Chimenti.  Her family emigrated to Tunis in 1884 when she was an infant. Chimenti grew up studying multiple languages in a multicultural environment, as well as learning from multiple faith disciplines.

Career 
After the death of her father, Chimenti moved to Germany where she wrote two books and continue to study. After marrying in 1912, Chimenti returned to Morocco where she helped her mother open an Italian school in Tangier in 1914, and would go on to teach there for many years. 

However, due to Mussolini gaining power years later, Chimenti was unable to continue running her school and became a full time journalist. Her writing centered largely around the people of Morocco, mainly women, as well as studying the different communities throughout Morocco.

Works 

 Meine Lieder, 1911
 Taitouma, 1913
 Èves Marocaines, 1935
 Chants de femmes arabes, 1942
 Légendes marocaines, 1950
 Les petits blancs marocains, 1950-1960
 Au cœur du harem, 1958
 Le sortilège (et autres contes séphardites), 1964

References 

1883 births
1969 deaths
20th-century Italian writers
Italian women writers
Italian expatriates in Tunisia
Italian expatriates in Morocco
Italian expatriates in Germany
20th-century Italian women
Writers from Naples